Sarasota National Cemetery is a  United States National Cemetery located in Sarasota County, Florida. Administered by the United States Department of Veterans Affairs, it is the sixth national cemetery developed in Florida.

History 

The Veterans Administration was authorized to establish six new burial sites by the National Cemetery Expansion Act of 2003, enacted on November 11, 2003. Areas not served by an existing National Cemetery and having at least 170,000 veteran residents included:
 Bakersfield, California
 Birmingham, Alabama
 Jacksonville, Florida
 Sarasota County, Florida
 Southeastern Pennsylvania
 Columbia- Greenville, South Carolina

Groundbreaking and dedication at the Sarasota site was held on June 1, 2008. The first interment was on January 9, 2009.

Site status 
The plan for development of the facility is composed of three phases, but only the first phase has been funded, at $27.8 million to accommodate 25,000 burials. Initial construction on those  began in June 2008 and created space for 18,200 casket burials within 15,200 designated crypts, 7,000 columbarium niches, and 500 in-ground cremations. The grounds were consecrated in December 2008, prior to the first burials.

Phase one includes an entrance, roadways within the section, a public information center with restrooms, and two solar-powered shelters for committal services during inclement weather. Infrastructure consisting of drainage, landscaping, irrigation, and utilities also is being built. Permanent buildings for administration and maintenance were scheduled for completion in 2010.

The 2,800-seat ceremonial amphitheater “Patriot Plaza”, donated by The Patterson Foundation of Sarasota, was completed June 28, 2014.  Every Tuesday at 10 a.m., there are guided tours of the commissioned art work located within the Patriot Plaza.

Notable burials
 Abner M. Aust (1921-2020), United States Air Force colonel and flying ace in World War II
 Rick Casares (1931–2013), United States Army soldier in the Korean War and professional football player
 Marty Springstead (1937–2012), United States Army veteran and Major League Baseball umpire
 Hal White (1919–2001), United States Navy veteran of World War II, and Major League Baseball pitcher

References

External links 
 National Cemetery Administration
 Sarasota National Cemetery
 
 

2009 establishments in Florida
Cemeteries in Florida
United States national cemeteries
Buildings and structures in Sarasota, Florida
Protected areas of Sarasota County, Florida